Muddebihal  is both a City and a Taluk in the Vijayapura district in the Indian state of Karnataka.

Geography
Muddebihal is located at 16° 20' 14" N and 76° 07' 55" E, with an average elevation of 563 meters (1847 feet) above sea level.  Muddebihal is 80 km/49.7 miles away from the main district city of Bijapur, and 500 km/310.68 miles from the state capital, Bangalore.  The nearest major railway station to Muddebihal is at Almatti (23 km), and the nearest airport is at Kalaburagi (184 km), Hyderabad 350 km

Demographics

As of the 2001 Indian census, Muddebihal had a population of 28,219, which categorizes it as a Class III town.  It has a total area of 8.25 km2. The population is evenly split, with males constituting 51% of the population, and females 49%, while 14% of the population is under 6 years of age. The average literacy rate of Muddebihal is 67%, which is higher than the national average of 59.5%: male literacy is 75%, and female literacy is 58%.  The economy is dependent on agriculture, with the main crops consisting of Ground nuts, Sunflowers, Bajra, and wheat. The average summer temperature is 42 °C, while the average winter temperature is 28 °C.

Muddebihal Religion Data 2011 
Population, 34,217

Hindu, 62.70%

Muslim, 34.21%

www.census2011.co.in

Muddebihal Town Municipal Council

Muddebihal Municipality was first established in 1973. It includes 23 wards, 23 elected members and five nominated members.

Education

Primary schools

There are both government-run and private schools in Muddebihal, and the private schools may be partly aided by the government.  Prior to 1985 there were only a few schools in the town: M. G.M.K English Medium Primary School, Sarkari Kannada Boys Primary School, Sarkari URDU Boys Primary School, Sarkari Kannada Girls Primary School, Sarkari URDU Girls Primary School,   and Jnana Bharati Vidya Mandir.  After 1990 many new Kannada and English primary schools were established. For example, Jnana Bharati Vidya Mandir, and Pinjara School were started in 2004 respectively.

High schools
M.G.M.K English Medium Highschool,
V. B. C. High School, the premier high school, was founded by Gangamma Chiniwar. It was the only high school until Mutayna High School was established in 1986. Jnana Bharati Vidya Mandir another high school, teaches the Hindu culture and Sanskrit. Other schools in the area include ANJUMAN HIGH SCHOOL, was founded by ANJUMAN-E-ISLAM COMMITTEE in 1962.  The alumni of V. B. C. High School hold very high positions in both the Government and private sectors.
sharada kannada english medium high school.

Colleges

The establishment of the M.G.V.C. College in 1969, through the "Shrimati Gangamma Veerappa Chiniwar Vidya Prasarak Trust"  fulfilled the need in Muddebihal and the surrounding rural area for an institute of higher learning. The Trust was formed when Matoshri Gangamma Veerappa Chiniwar donated her property to a trust for the betterment of education. M.G.V.C. College is affiliated with Rani Channamma University, Belgaum and awards the following bachelor's degrees:
B.A. in History, Economics, Political Science
B.A. in History, Economics, Sociology
B.Sc. in Chemistry, Botany, Zoology
B.Sc. in Physics, Chemistry, Mathematics
B.Com. (Regular)

The trust has also established the following institutions in Muddebihal, which are instrumental in imparting high quality education and training to thousands of children from impoverished families:
M.G.V.C. Arts, Commerce & Science College 
M.G.V.C. Arts, Commerce & Science P U College 
M.G.V.C. JOC Courses in Library Science, Sericulture and NTC 
Gangamata Balamandir 
Gangamata I.T.I 
M.G.V.C.T.T.I (D.Ed.) College 
Teacher Education Institute awarding D.Ed degrees - from 2004-05.

Villages

Villages in Muddebihal Taluk

 Abbihal
 Advi Hulagabal
 Advi Somnal
 Agasabal
 Alkoppa
 Alur
 Amaragol
 Arasanal
 Areshankar
 Aremural
 Bailkur
 Balabatti
 Baladinni
 Balaganur
 Balawat
 Bangaragund
 Banoshi
 Basarkod
 Bavoor
 Belur

 Bhantnur
 Bidarkundi
 Bijjur
 Bilebhavi
 Bolawad
 Bommanahalli
 Budihal P.N
 Chalami
 Chavanbhavi
 Chirchankal
 Chokavi
 Chondi
 Devarhulagabal
 Devoor
 Dhavalagi
 Donkamadu
 Fatepur P.T
 GadiSomanal
 Gangur
 Garasangi

 Geddalamari
 Ghalapuji
 Gonal P.N.
 Gonal S.H
 Gotakhindaki
 Gudadinni
 Gudihal
 Gudnal
 Gundakanal
 Gundakarjagi
 Guttihal
 Hadagali
 Hadaginal
 Hadalageri
 Hagaragund
 Hallur
 Handargall
 Handral
 Harindral
 Harnal

 Hiremural
 Hirur
 Hokrani
 Hosahalli
 Hullur
 Hunakunti
 Huvinahalli
 Inchagal
 Ingalagi
 Ingalgeri
 Jainapur
 Jakkeral
 Jalapur
 Jammaladinni
 Jangamural
 Jettagi
 Kaladevanahalli
 Kalagi
 Kamaldinni
 Kandaganur

 Karaganur
 Kashinakunti
 Kavadimatti
 Kesapur
 Khanapur
 Khanikeri
 Khilarahatti
 Kodaganur
 Kolur
 Konnur
 Koppa
 Kuchabal
 Kunchaganur
 Kuntoji
 Kyatanadoni
 Kyatanal
 Lakkundi
 Lingadalli
 Lotageri
 Madari

 Madikeshirur
 Madinal
 Maileshwar
 Malagaladinni
 Maskanal
 Masuti
 Matakal D
 Mavinbhavi
 Minajagi
 Mudnal
 Mudur
 Mukihal
 Nadahalli
 Nagabenal
 Nagarabetta
 Nagaral
 Nagur
 Nalatawad
 Navadagi
 Nebageri

 Nerabenchi
 Padekanur
 Peerapur
 Rakkasagi
 Rudagi
 Salawadagi
 Sarur
 Shellagi
 Shirol
 Shivapur
 Shidalabhavi
 Siddapur P.N
 Siddapur P.T
 Sultanpur
 Takkalaki
 Tamadaddi
 Tangadagi
 Tapalkatti
 Taranal
 Tumbagi

 Vanahalli
 Wadawadagi
 Wanakihal
 Yalagur
 Yaragalla
 Yarazeri
 Kapanur
 Karkur

See also
Bijapur
Sindagi
Basavana Bagewadi
Kudalasangama
Bagalkot
Karnataka

References

Cities and towns in Bijapur district, Karnataka
Taluks of Karnataka